The High Commissioner of the United Kingdom to Eswatini is the United Kingdom's foremost diplomatic representative in the Kingdom of Eswatini (aka Swaziland), and head of the UK's diplomatic mission in Mbabane.

As fellow members of the Commonwealth of Nations, the United Kingdom and Mbabane conduct their diplomatic relations at governmental level, rather than between Heads of State. Therefore, the countries exchange High Commissioners, rather than ambassadors.

The UK has been represented by its High Commissioner to South Africa, but in 2018, it was announced that the UK would return to having a resident high commissioner.

Non-resident High Commissioners to Eswatini 

 as High Commissioners to South Africa

 2013–2017: Dame Judith Macgregor
 2017–2019: Nigel Casey

High Commissioners to Eswatini 

  2019 - 2020: John Lindfield MBE
 From 2020 : Simon Boyden

External links 

 UK and Zambia, gov.uk

References 

Eswatini
 
Eswatini and the Commonwealth of Nations
United Kingdom